"He's Got the Power" is a song written by Ellie Greenwich and Tony Powers.  it was first recorded by the American girl group  The Exciters in 1963.  It was released on United Artists Records and peaked at # 57 on the US Billboard Top 100.  The recording was produced by Leiber, Stoller and the arrangement was by Teacho Wiltshire.

The song was used for an early "video", a process called "scopitone", which was intended to be viewed on a screen on a juke box.  The process did not catch on.

The song was covered by the French girl group Les Gam's in 1963, in French, renamed "Il a le truc."

It was also sung by Sidney Flanigan in the opening scene of the movie Never Rarely Sometimes Always

References

1963 singles
1963 songs
Songs written by Tony Powers
Songs written by Ellie Greenwich